Humptulips is a census-designated place (CDP) in Grays Harbor County, Washington, United States. The population of the CDP was 255 according to the 2010 census.

Etymology
The name Humptulips was the name of a band of the Chehalis tribe who lived in the area.  The name comes from a local Native American language, meaning 'hard to pole', referring to the difficulty local Native Americans had poling their canoes along the Humptulips River. According to other sources the word means 'chilly region'. It has frequently been noted on lists of unusual place names.

Geography
Humptulips is located on the Humptulips River and is within the Hoquiam School District boundary.

Climate
Humptulips is in a temperate rain forest. The climate in this area has mild differences between highs and lows, and there is adequate rainfall year-round.  According to the Köppen Climate Classification system, Humptulips has a marine west coast climate, abbreviated "Cfb" on climate maps.

Demographics

As of the census of 2000, there were 216 people, 81 households, and 60 families residing in the CDP. The population density was 22.8 people per square mile (8.8/km2). There were 93 housing units at an average density of 9.8/sq mi (3.8/km2). The racial makeup of the CDP was 79.17% White, 3.24% Native American, 0.93% Asian, 11.57% from other races, and 5.09% from two or more races. Hispanic or Latino of any race were 13.89% of the population.

There were 81 households, out of which 39.5% had children under the age of 18 living with them, 55.6% were married couples living together, 11.1% had a female householder with no husband present, and 24.7% were non-families. 16.0% of all households were made up of individuals, and 1.2% had someone living alone who was 65 years of age or older. The average household size was 2.67 and the average family size was 2.87.

In the CDP, the population was spread out, with 27.8% under the age of 18, 6.5% from 18 to 24, 29.2% from 25 to 44, 30.1% from 45 to 64, and 6.5% who were 65 years of age or older. The median age was 37 years. For every 100 females, there were 109.7 males. For every 100 females age 18 and over, there were 105.3 males.

The median income for a household in the CDP was $26,000, and the median income for a family was $22,188. Males had a median income of $38,125 versus $17,500 for females. The per capita income for the CDP was $10,210. About 26.9% of families and 32.7% of the population were below the poverty line, including 40.6% of those under the age of eighteen and 23.5% of those 65 or over.

References

External links
 Current streamflow gauge of the Humptulips River

census-designated places in Grays Harbor County, Washington
census-designated places in Washington (state)